Jingdong Subdistrict  is a subdistrict under the jurisdiction of Jingyang District, Deyang City, Sichuan Province, People's Republic of China. , it administers the following eight residential communities:
Yihe Community
Dongshan Community
Chunjin Community
Tianshan Community
Longjing Community
Jinghu Community
Le'an Community
Tuojiang Community

See also
List of township-level divisions of Sichuan

References

Township-level divisions of Sichuan
Deyang